Oak Valley is a community in the United Counties of Stormont, Dundas and Glengarry, Ontario.

Communities in the United Counties of Stormont, Dundas and Glengarry